Dr. Shruti Kapoor (born 25 September) is an Indian economist, women's rights activist, and social entrepreneur.

She is the founder of Sayfty, an initiative that aims to educate and empower young women and girls against all forms of violence.

Background 
Born in Kanpur, India Kapoor moved to the United States in 2000. After earning a master's degree in economics from Marquette University, she worked as an economist for the World Bank in Washington, DC for two years. Following this, she moved to California to complete her PhD in economics, and remained a consultant for the World Bank. After graduating with a doctorate degree, Kapoor taught economics at Occidental College for a year.

Activism and social entrepreneurship 
Dr. Kapoor founded Sayfty in June 2013 as an initiative to educate, and empower young women and girls against all forms of violence. The initiative aims at training young women and girls in self-defense, the use of safety tools including pepper-spray, awareness of laws and legal rights, and creating dialogue around safety and what makes women feel unsafe. Sayfty was awarded the People's Choice Award by Femvertising in 2015. Kapoor founded Sayfty in the wake of the 2012 Delhi gang rape and murder of a 23-year-old female, which shocked the country and caught the attention of the global news media.

In May, 2019, Kapoor started a public petition on Charge.org to oppose two shelters for women and children in her neighborhood of Park Slope, Brooklyn, New York City. In her opposition to the shelters she stated that "locating two large buildings for the homeless on two adjacent blocks is not fair to our community", and that they would have "a negative impact on the property value” despite providing no evidence that homeless shelters affect property values.

Public Speaking
As an activist, Dr. Kapoor has addressed many public forums including the Youth Assembly at the United Nations in August 2016.

In August 2017, Shruti delivered a Talk at 2017 Summer Youth Assembly at the United Nations, addressing her work around the use of technology to address gender equality.

In March 2017, Shruti moderated a panel on Young Women As An Economic Force at Youth Forum (CSW61)at the United Nations.

In January 2017, Shruti addressed the Winter Youth Assembly at the United Nations. She talked about Young Women's Economic Empowerment.

In November 2016, In celebration of the International Day for the Elimination of Violence against Women, Organized by UN Women and the United Nations Inter-Agency Network on Youth Development, Shruti talked about the impact of violence against women on young women's economic empowerment.

In August 2016, Shruti addressed the Summer Youth Assembly at the United Nations on two separate panels. Her first talk focused on Youth Involvement at the United Nations. The second talk focused on Investing in Young Women's Leadership.

Awards and recognition
Dr. Kapoor is named by Apolitical as One of the Most Influential People in Global Policy 2019.

Indian Ministry of Women and Child Development facilitated Dr. Kapoor as one of the 30 #WebWonderWomen who have been driving positive agenda of social change via social media.

Richtopia named Dr. Kapoor as one of the top 100 leaders from multilateral organizations globally in 2018.

Dr. Kapoor served on the judging panel for Anu and Naveen Jain's $1 million, Women Safety Xprize competition.

Dr. Kapoor is the recipient of the International Women Of The Year Award by Aosta Valley, Italy (2015). She was the 2nd runners up. She also received the Rex Karamveer Global Fellowship on the 23rd of March, in New Delhi at the exclusive awards function, which is a part of “iCONGO’s REX Conclive, organized on 21st, 22nd,  `and 23rd of March 2015.

In March 2016, she was one of the EU top 200 Women in the World of Development Wall of Fame. She was also one of the nominated changemakers for the United State of Women 2016. She is a three-time story award winner with World Pulse
 
In September 2016, Shruti was one of the women shortlisted for the Rising Stars Award 2016 by We are the City India, which she went onto win. In October 2016, she was recognized as one of the "52 Feminists" by 52Feminists.com.

References

External links
About Our Founder: Shruti Kapoor (Sayfty)

Indian social entrepreneurs
20th-century Indian businesswomen
20th-century Indian businesspeople
Living people
Indian human rights activists
Indian women economists
World Bank people
Marquette University alumni
University of California, Riverside alumni
Indian women's rights activists
20th-century Indian economists
People from Kanpur
Activists from Uttar Pradesh
Year of birth missing (living people)
Businesspeople from Uttar Pradesh
Women scientists from Uttar Pradesh
Businesswomen from Uttar Pradesh